Haitian Center Tower 2 is a skyscraper that architecturally topped out in 2020. Located in the Shinan District of Qingdao, China, it is the tallest building in Shandong Province, among the 50 tallest buildings in China, and among the 100 tallest buildings in the world.

See also 
 List of tallest buildings

References 

Skyscrapers in Qingdao
2021 establishments in China
Towers completed in 2021